Johannes Kinnvall (born July 28, 1997) is a Swedish professional ice hockey defenceman currently playing with Brynäs IF of the Swedish Hockey League (SHL).

Playing career
While playing for Brynäs IF, Kinnvall made his Swedish Hockey League debut during the 2016–17 SHL season.

On 29 April 2020, Kinnvall was signed a two-year entry level contract with the Calgary Flames of the National Hockey League. That same day it was announced that he would spend the first year of the contract to continue on loan with HV71 of the SHL.

At the conclusion of his entry-level deal with the Flames, Kinnvall as an impending restricted free agent returned to his original Swedish club, Brynäs IF, signing a two-year contract to continue in the SHL on 20 June 2022.

Career statistics

References

External links
 

1997 births
Living people
Brynäs IF players
HV71 players
Stockton Heat players
Swedish ice hockey defencemen
Timrå IK players
People from Gävle
Sportspeople from Gävleborg County